The 1977–78 AHL season was the 42nd season of the American Hockey League. The season was in jeopardy when the last of the original eight franchises of the "International-American Hockey League", the Rhode Island Reds (previously Providence Reds) folded in the offseason, and the AHL was left with five teams. The league increased its member teams by four, when the North American Hockey League and Southern Hockey Leagues both folded before the 1977–78 season. Two teams joined from the NAHL, and another from the SHL, along with one expansion team.

North and south divisions were resumed. The F. G. "Teddy" Oke Trophy resumes as the regular season championship trophy for the north division, and the John D. Chick Trophy resumes as the regular season championship trophy for the south division. The Fred T. Hunt Memorial Award is first awarded to the player best exemplifying sportsmanship, determination and dedication to hockey.

Nine teams were scheduled to play 80 games each, however the Hampton Gulls folded on February 10, 1978, playing 46 games. The Maine Mariners finished first overall in the regular season, and won the Calder Cup championship as a first year expansion team.

Team changes
 The Maine Mariners join the AHL as an expansion team, based in Portland, Maine, playing in the North Division.
 The Broome Dusters, of the defunct North American Hockey League, acquire and merge with the Rhode Island Reds. The Reds are relocated to Binghamton, New York, and play as the Binghamton Dusters in the North Division.
 The Philadelphia Firebirds, based in Philadelphia, Pennsylvania, transfer to the AHL as an expansion team, from the defunct North American Hockey League, and play in the South Division.
 The Hampton Gulls, based in Hampton, Virginia, transfer to the AHL as an expansion team, from the defunct Southern Hockey League, and play in the South Division.

Final standings
Note: GP = Games played; W = Wins; L = Losses; T = Ties; GF = Goals for; GA = Goals against; Pts = Points;

†Suspended operations.

Scoring leaders

Note: GP = Games played; G = Goals; A = Assists; Pts = Points; PIM = Penalty minutes

 complete list

Calder Cup playoffs

Trophy and award winners
Team awards

Individual awards

Other awards

See also
List of AHL seasons

External links
AHL official site
AHL Hall of Fame
HockeyDB

 
American Hockey League seasons
3
3